The 2008 United States House election in Delaware was held on November 4, 2008 to determine who will represent the state of Delaware in the United States House of Representatives for the 111th Congress, coinciding with the presidential election. The primary election was held on September 9, 2008.

Delaware has a single at-large representative in the House of Representatives. Republican incumbent Mike Castle was reelected for an eighth term. , this was the last congressional election in Delaware won by a Republican, the last statewide election where a Republican won by a double digit margin, the last statewide race where the Republican won New Castle County and the last time a Republican won a statewide election during a presidential election year. It was an impressive display of ticket-splitting by Delaware voters, as Castle, a Republican, obtained over 60% of the vote, while the Democratic candidates in the concurrent Presidential, Senate, and Gubernatorial elections all received over 60% of the vote as well.

Match-up summary

Overview

The state of Delaware is completely contained in a single at-large district. The district had a Cook Partisan Voting Index of D+7 in 2008. Since 1993, the district had been represented by Republican Michael N. Castle.

Primary election
Primary elections in Delaware are closed primaries; that is, only voters who have declared a party affiliation may vote in that party's primary. Three Democrats were on the primary ballot: children's rights advocate and 2006 independent candidate Karen Hartley-Nagle, veterinarian and Vietnam War veteran Jerry Northington, and Michael Miller. Hartley-Nagle was nominated with 55.4 percent of the vote, with turnout at 28 percent. Castle did not face any Republican primary challengers.

General election
In the general election, Republican incumbent Mike Castle was challenged by Democratic nominee Karen Hartley-Nagle and Libertarian Party candidate Mark Anthony Parks. CQ Politics forecasted the race in Delaware's At-large congressional district as 'Safe Republican'. Castle enjoyed a lead throughout the campaign, and ultimately won the election with slightly over 61 percent of the votes cast. Statewide turnout for the election was at 68 percent.

See also
 2006 United States House of Representatives election in Delaware

References

External links
Castle's campaign website
Hartley-Nagle's campaign website
Northington's campaign website
Delaware Commissioner of Elections
Race ranking and details from CQ Politics

Delaware U.S. House Races from 2008 Race Tracker
Campaign contributions from OpenSecrets

2008
elaware
United States House of Representatives